Antaeotricha habilis is a moth of the family Depressariidae. It is found in Guyana.

The wingspan is 17–20 mm. The forewings are pale greyish-ochreous with a blackish dash near the base above the middle and a spot of dark grey suffusion on the dorsum at one-third, as well as a series of three or four irregular dark grey marks from near the costa before the middle to near the dark fuscous second discal stigma. There is an irregular-edged suffused transverse dark fuscous patch from the dorsum beneath the second discal stigma, nearly reaching it and a cloudy curved interrupted grey subterminal shade from opposite the apex to the tornus. A series of small dark fuscous marginal dots is found around the apex and termen, sometimes little marked. The hindwings are pale greyish.

References

Moths described in 1915
habilis
Moths of South America
Taxa named by Edward Meyrick